Markus Lie (born 21 June 1995) is a Norwegian swimmer. He competed in the men's 100 metre freestyle event at the 2017 World Aquatics Championships.

References

External links
 

1995 births
Living people
Place of birth missing (living people)
Norwegian male freestyle swimmers
21st-century Norwegian people